Lanark–Renfrew–Carleton (also known as Lanark and Renfrew) was a federal electoral district represented in the House of Commons of Canada from 1968 to 1988. It was located in the province of Ontario.

This riding was created as "Lanark and Renfrew" in 1966 from parts of Carleton, Lanark, Renfrew North and Renfrew South ridings.

Lanark and Renfrew was initially defined to consist of:

(a) in the County of Carleton, the Townships of Fitzroy, Huntley, March and Torbolton;

(b) in the County of Lanark, the Townships of Beckwith, Darling, Drummond, Lanark, Pakenham and Ramsay; and

(c) in the County of Renfrew, the Townships of Admaston, Bagot, Blythfield, Bromley, Horton, McNab, Ross and Westmeath.

The name of the electoral district was changed in 1970 to Lanark–Renfrew–Carleton. 
In 1976, it was redefined to consist of

(a) in the Regional Municipality of Ottawa-Carleton, the Townships of March and West Carleton;

(b) the County of Lanark, including the Town of Smiths Falls; and

(c) in the County of Renfrew, the Townships of Bagot and Blythfield and McNab.

The electoral district was abolished in 1987 when it was redistributed between Lanark–Carleton and Renfrew.

Members of Parliament

This riding has elected the following Members of Parliament:

Election results

Lanark and Renfrew

|}

Lanark–Renfrew–Carleton

|}

|}

|}

|}

See also 

 List of Canadian federal electoral districts
 Past Canadian electoral districts

External links 
 Parliamentary website: Lanark and Renfrew
 Parliamentary website: Lanark—Renfrew—Carleton

Former federal electoral districts of Ontario